The 1922 United States Senate election in Massachusetts was held on Tuesday, November 7. Incumbent Republican Senator Henry Cabot Lodge was re-elected to a fifth term in office over Democrat William A. Gaston.

Republican primary

Candidates

Declared
 Henry Cabot Lodge, incumbent Senator and Senate Majority Leader
 Joseph H. Walker, former Speaker of the Massachusetts House of Representatives

Campaign
Walker accused Lodge of having "reactionary" tendencies and not properly representing the Republican Party.

Results

Democratic primary

Candidates

Declared
 William A. Gaston, nominee for governor in 1902 and 1903 and son of former Governor William Gaston
 Dallas Lore Sharp, author and Boston University professor
 John Jackson Walsh, former State Senator and 1920 gubernatorial nominee
 Sherman L. Whipple, attorney and candidate for U.S. Senate in 1911 and 1913

Results

General election

Candidates
 Washington Cook, rubber manufacturer and brother of Alonzo B. Cook (Independent)
 William A. Gaston, nominee for governor in 1902 and 1903 and son of former Governor William Gaston (Democratic)
 Henry Cabot Lodge, incumbent Senator since 1893 (Republican)
 John A. Nicholls (Prohibition Progressive)
 John Weaver Sherman (Socialist)
 William E. Weeks, former Mayor of Everett (Progressive)

Campaign
Washington Cook ran on a platform that supported the League of Nations, women's suffrage, enforcement of the 18th Amendment, measures to stop the lynching of African-Americans in the south, creation of a national divorce law, and adequate compensation for soldiers.

Results

References

1922
Massachusetts
1922 Massachusetts elections